Gilldora is a rural locality in the Gympie Region, Queensland, Australia.

History 
The locality takes its name from its former railway station name, which in turn was named on 16  October 1922, reportedly a coined word from local resident Gillman "dorado", which happens to be an Aboriginal word meaning pleasant place.

Geography
The Mary River forms the north-eastern and eastern boundaries.

Road infrastructure
The Mary Valley Road (State Route 51) runs through from north-west to south.

References 

Gympie Region
Localities in Queensland